St. George Orthodox Church is the biggest church in Chungathara, Kerala, India. It was built before 1960.

Malabar's biggest Orthodox convention organised by this church every year in January lasts for eight days, the conventions end with 5-inmel Qurbana approximately 10000 people attending the Qurbana.

References

Churches in Malappuram district
Malankara Orthodox Syrian church buildings